Hans Jakob Christoffel von Grimmelshausen (1621/22 – 17 August 1676) was a German author. He is best known for his 1669 picaresque novel Simplicius Simplicissimus and the accompanying Simplician Scriptures series.

Early life 
Grimmelshausen was born at Gelnhausen. At the age of ten he was kidnapped by Hessian soldiery, and in their midst experienced military life in the Thirty Years' War. In 1639 he became a regular soldier in the Imperial Army. At the latest in the year 1644 he worked as a writer in a regiment's chancellery—from that year on documents by Hans Jakob Christoffel exist. At the close of the war, Grimmelshausen entered the service of Franz Egon von Fürstenberg, bishop of Strasbourg. In 1665, he was made magistrate at Renchen in Baden. On obtaining this appointment, he devoted himself to literary pursuits.

Works 

Grimmelshausen's work is greatly influenced by previous utopian and travel literature, and the Simplicissimus series attained a readership larger than any other seventeenth-century novel. Formerly, he was credited with Der fliegende Wandersmann nach dem Mond, a translation from Jean Baudoin L'Homme dans la Lune, itself a translation of Francis Godwins The Man in the Moone, but recent scholars have disputed this; he did, however, write an appendix to a 1667 edition of that translation, the basis for that association. Der fliegende Wandersman was included in his collected works, though without the appendix.

In 1668, Grimmelshausen published Der abenteuerliche Simplicissimus, which has been called the greatest German novel of the 17th century.  For this work he took as his model the picaresque romances of Spain, already to some extent known in Germany. Simplicissimus has been interpreted as its author's autobiography; he begins with the childhood of his hero, and describes the latter's adventures amid the stirring scenes of the Thirty Years' War. The rustic detail with which these pictures are presented makes the book a valuable document of its time. For some, however, the later parts of the book overindulge in allegory, and finally become a Robinson Crusoe story.

The historian Robert Ergang draws upon Gustav Könnecke's Quellen und Forschungen zur Lebensgeschichte Grimmelshausens to assert that "the events related in the novel Simplicissimus could hardly have been autobiographical since [Grimmelshausen] lived a peaceful existence in quiet towns and villages on the fringe of the Black Forest and that the material he incorporated in his work was not taken from actual experience, but was either borrowed from the past, collected from hearsay, or created by a vivid imagination."

Among Grimmelshausen's other works, are the so-called Simplicianische Schriften:

Die Ertzbetrügerin and Landstörtzerin Courasche (1670)
Der seltsame Springinsfeld (1670)
Das wunderbarliche Vogelnest (1672)

He also published satires, such as Der teutsche Michel (1673), and gallant novels, like Dietwald und Amelinde (1670).

Death and legacy 

He died in Renchen in 1676, where a monument was erected to him in 1879.

Grimmelshausen's Landstörtzerin Courasche became an inspiration for Bertolt Brecht's play Mother Courage and Her Children.

Der abenteuerliche Simplicissimus lent its name to Simplicissimus, a satirical German weekly which ran from 1894 to 1944 and 1954 to 1967.

Notes

References

Further reading

External links 

 
 
 
 Author page for Grimmelshausen on Projekt Gutenberg-DE

1620s births
1676 deaths
People from Gelnhausen
German satirists
Writers from Hesse
German people of the Thirty Years' War
17th-century German writers
17th-century German novelists
German male novelists
German-language poets
German male poets
German male non-fiction writers
17th-century German male writers
Baroque writers